John Elliott (12 October 1901 – 3 July 1945) was a British middleweight boxer who competed in the 1920s.

Biography
Elliott won a silver medal in boxing at the 1924 Summer Olympics in Paris, losing against the successful British boxer Harry Mallin in the final bout. He won the Amateur Boxing Association 1924 and 1925 middleweight title, when boxing out of the Polytechnic Boxing Club.

At some point following his Olympic appearance, Elliott emigrated to Australia. On 8 April 1941, a year-and-a-half after the outbreak of the Second World War, he enlisted in the Australian Army in Paddington, New South Wales, giving his residence as Sydney. He was discharged as a staff sergeant in 1943 and became a war correspondent. On 3 July 1945, while covering the invasion of Balikpapan with fellow journalist William Smith, Elliott went ahead of the advancing Australian troops; a Bren gunner, believing them to be Japanese troops, shot and killed them both.

References

External links
John Elliott's profile at databaseOlympics
John Elliott's profile at Sports Reference.com

1901 births
1945 deaths
Middleweight boxers
Olympic boxers of Great Britain
Olympic silver medallists for Great Britain
Boxers at the 1924 Summer Olympics
Place of birth missing
England Boxing champions
Olympic medalists in boxing
British male boxers
Medalists at the 1924 Summer Olympics
Australian Army personnel of World War II
Australian Army soldiers
Australian civilians killed in World War II
Australian war correspondents
War correspondents of World War II
Friendly fire incidents of World War II
Military personnel killed by friendly fire
Deaths by firearm in Indonesia
Accidental deaths in Indonesia
Journalists killed while covering World War II
British emigrants to Australia